1800 Seconds: Curated By Pusha-T, commonly referred to as 1800 Seconds, is a compilation album by ten different DIY artists curated by the hip-hop artist Pusha T, released on December 7, 2018, by Re-Up Gang Records and Mass Appeal Records. The album consist of up-and-coming voices, hailing from all over the United States. Ant White from Philly, PA, Cartel Count Up from Hampton, VA, Don Zio P from Middletown, CT, Hass Irv from Harlem, NY, Monalyse from Detroit, MI, Nita Jonez from Houston, TX, Sam Austins from Detroit, MI, T Got Bank from Brooklyn, NY, Trevor Lanier from Wilmington, NC, and Tyler Thomas from Los Angeles, CA.

Track listing
Credits adapted from liner notes.

Notes
 Track listing and credits from Tidal.

References

External links 
 

2018 compilation albums
Pusha T albums